Saraswati Parbat II is a mountain of the Garhwal Himalaya in Uttarakhand India.The elevation of Saraswati Parbat II is  and its prominence is . It is 37th highest located entirely within the Uttrakhand. Nanda Devi, is the highest mountain in this category. It falls under Kamet Zaskar Range. It lies between Saraswati Parbat I and Chamrao Parbat I It lies 3.1 km NNW of Chamrao Parbat I . Its nearest higher neighbor Saraswati Parbat I . It is located 9.1 km NNW of Mukut Parbat  and 7.1 km west lies Balbala .

Neighboring and subsidiary peaks
neighboring or subsidiary peaks of Saraswati Parbat II:
 Kamet: , 
 Abi Gamin: , 
 Mukut Parbat: , 
 Chamrao Parbat I: , 
 Saraswati Parbat I: , 
 Balbala (mountain): ,

Glaciers and rivers
On the south western side lies Uttari Chamrao Glacier, Dakshini Chamrao Glacier, Balbala Glacier, Khagyan Glacier and Paschimi Kamet glacier all these glaciers drain their water in the Saraswati River which then joins Alaknanda River at Keshav Prayag near Mana village one of the main tributaries of river Ganga. River Alaknanda merges with river Bhagirathi the other main tributaries of river Ganga at Dev Prayag and called Ganga there after.

See also

 List of Himalayan peaks of Uttarakhand

References

Mountains of Uttarakhand
Six-thousanders of the Himalayas
Geography of Chamoli district